The 1950 Montreal Alouettes was the fifth season for the franchise as they competed in the Interprovincial Rugby Football Union, the highest level of play in eastern Canada. Finishing in third place within the IRFU, the Alouettes failed to make the playoffs despite winning the 37th Grey Cup the previous season.

Background 

In 1949, the Montreal Alouettes finished with an 8–4 record. The team became Grey Cup champions by defeating the Calgary Stampeders 28–15.

Acquisitions 

The Alouettes signed tackle Jim Ambrose from the Quebec Senior Football League before the start of the regular season.

Preseason

Regular season 

By late August, head coach Lew Hayman publicly stated that the Alouettes were performing more poorly than they had the previous season. The team had failed to find permanent starters for two spots on their roster, a tackle and an end. Hayman hoped to fill those roster spots with American players, but he also pointed to a "lack of drive" from the team to explain their two preseason losses. He predicted that the team would struggle for "a third of the schedule" before improving. This prediction proved accurate. After the Alouettes won their season opener against Ottawa Rough Riders, they lost their next four games to fall to a 1–4 record. Their poor performance was partially blamed on injuries, a situation which worsened when former all-star halfback John Harper suffered a dislocated shoulder in a late September exhibition game against the McGill Redmen. The Alouettes improved in October, winning four of their next five games to reach an even 5–5 record. They remained a possible playoff team through the final week, when a win by the Hamilton Tiger-Cats pushed them into third place and prevented them from making the playoffs. The Alouettes finished with a 6–6 record.

Season standings

Season schedule

References 

Montreal Alouettes seasons
Alouettes
1950 in Quebec
1950s in Montreal